Devils Desk is a stratovolcano in Alaska's Katmai National Park, split between the Kodiak Island and Lake and Peninsula boroughs of that U.S. state. The age of the volcano is not certain, but a sample from the southwest face of the volcano was dated at 245,000 years old. The edifice represents the neck of a formerly larger stratovolcano, whose flanks have been removed by glacial erosion. The summit is almost encircled by Hook Glacier.

See also
List of volcanoes in the United States of America

References

External links
 Devils Desk at the Alaska Volcano Observatory

Volcanoes of Kodiak Island Borough, Alaska
Volcanoes of Lake and Peninsula Borough, Alaska
Volcanoes of Alaska
Stratovolcanoes of the United States
Katmai National Park and Preserve
Pleistocene stratovolcanoes